Ichneumon unicinctus is a species of wasp in the genus Ichneumon. It is endemic to Madagascar, Mauritius and Réunion.

References

Insects described in 1846
Ichneumoninae
Insects of Réunion
Taxa named by Gaspard Auguste Brullé
Insects of Mauritius
Insects of Madagascar